Nasrabad (also Romanized as Naşrābād) is a village in Kaftarak Rural District, in the Central District of Shiraz County, Fars Province, Iran. At the 2006 census, its population was 4,293, in 1,061 families.

References 

Populated places in Shiraz County